UFC 102: Couture vs. Nogueira was a mixed martial arts pay-per-view event held by the Ultimate Fighting Championship (UFC) on August 29, 2009 at the Rose Garden in Portland, Oregon. It featured former five-time UFC champion and UFC Hall of Famer Randy Couture, facing off against former PRIDE FC Heavyweight Champion and former Interim UFC Heavyweight Champion, Antônio Rodrigo Nogueira.

Background 

Randy Couture was originally offered a title defense against Antônio Rodrigo Nogueira at UFC 81, however turned the fight down after his resignation from the UFC in October 2007.  While Couture and the UFC sorted out their legal issues, Nogueira defeated Tim Sylvia for the Interim UFC Heavyweight Championship becoming the first fighter to hold both PRIDE and UFC title belts.  Nogueira was then set to coach against Frank Mir on the eighth season of The Ultimate Fighter with the two facing off for the Interim Championship after the season aired.

Eventually Couture and the UFC reconciled and it was announced that he would return to the Octagon to defend his title against Brock Lesnar at UFC 91. Neither Couture or Nogueira were successful in their defense efforts and then faced each other in what amounted to a "losers bracket" of the UFC's mini heavyweight tournament.

A previously announced bout between Kyle Kingsbury and Razak Al-Hassan was moved to UFC 104 in Los Angeles, California on October 24, 2009. Matt Hamill pulled out of a bout with Brandon Vera due to injury. Krzysztof Soszynski took his place.

A knee injury forced James Irvin out of his bout with Wilson Gouveia.  He was replaced by Ed Herman. On August 7, 2009 it was reported that Gouveia was also off the card due to a back injury. Marcus Aurélio replaced an injured Matt Veach.

Results

Bonus awards 
Fighters were awarded $60,000 bonuses.

Fight of the Night: Randy Couture vs. Antônio Rodrigo Nogueira
Knockout of the Night: Nate Marquardt
Submission of the Night: Jake Rosholt

Reported payout 
The following is the reported payout to the fighters as reported to the Oregon State Athletic Commission. It does not include sponsor money or "locker room" bonuses often given by the UFC.

Antônio Rodrigo Nogueira: ($400,000 includes $150,000 win bonus) def. Randy Couture: ($250,000)
Thiago Silva: ($58,000 includes $29,000 win bonus) def. Keith Jardine: ($55,000)
Jake Rosholt: ($26,000 includes $13,000 win bonus) def. Chris Leben: ($30,000)
Nate Marquardt: ($80,000 includes $40,000 win bonus) def. Demian Maia ($28,000)
Brandon Vera: ($70,000 includes $35,000 win bonus) def. Krzystzof Soszynski: ($8,000)
Aaron Simpson: ($18,000 includes $9,000 win bonus) def. Ed Herman: ($24,000)
Gabriel Gonzaga: ($120,000 includes $60,000 win bonus) def. Chris Tuchscherer: ($10,000)
Mike Russow: ($20,000 includes $10,000 win bonus) def. Justin McCully: ($15,000)
Todd Duffee: ($10,000 includes $5,000 win bonus) def. Tim Hague: ($7,000)
Mark Muñoz: ($24,000 includes $12,000 win bonus) def. Nick Catone: ($5,000)
Evan Dunham: ($14,000 includes $7,000 win bonus) def. Marcus Aurélio: ($13,000)

See also
 Ultimate Fighting Championship
 List of UFC champions
 List of UFC events
 2009 in UFC

References

Ultimate Fighting Championship events
2009 in mixed martial arts
Mixed martial arts in Oregon
Events in Portland, Oregon
Sports in Portland, Oregon
Sports competitions in Oregon
2009 in sports in Oregon
2009 in Portland, Oregon